Northwestern Air is an airline based in Fort Smith, Northwest Territories, Canada. It operates scheduled passenger services to seven destinations in two territories / provinces, as well as undertaking ad hoc charters and long term charter contracts for various corporations throughout Canada and the United States.

Its main base is Fort Smith Airport.

History 

The airline was established in 1965 as a leasing company and started flying operations in 1968. It expanded to operate scheduled passenger services in 1984. It is wholly owned by the Harrold family and had more than 70 employees in September 2018.

Destinations 
The airline serves the following locations:

Fleet
As of November 2022, the Northwestern Air fleet includes 15 aircraft registered with Transport Canada and 14 listed at the Northwestern Air web site:

Previously operated include:
 Piper Aerostar
 Beechcraft Queen Air
 Beechcraft Baron
 Beechcraft Model 99
 Cessna 150
 Cessna 208
 Cessna 310
 Cessna Skymaster
 Cessna 401 and 402
 de Havilland Canada DHC-2 Beaver
 de Havilland Canada DHC-3 Otter
 North American B-25 Mitchell
 Piper PA-16 Clipper
 Fairchild Swearingen Metroliner

References

External links

Northwestern Air

Airlines established in 1965
Regional airlines of the Northwest Territories
Seaplane operators